The Burkina Faso national handball team is the national handball team of Burkina Faso.

African Championship record
2012 – 12th place

References

External links
IHF profile

Men's national handball teams
National sports teams of Burkina Faso